Manuel Valdes (born 24 February 1956) is a Filipino former sports shooter. He competed in the trap event at the 1972 Summer Olympics.

References

External links
 

1956 births
Living people
Filipino male sport shooters
Olympic shooters of the Philippines
Shooters at the 1972 Summer Olympics
Place of birth missing (living people)